Liulin is a village in Southern Bulgaria. The village is located in Pernik Municipality, Pernik Province. Аccording to the numbers provided by the 2020 Bulgarian census, Ciuipetlovo currently has a population of 748 people with a permanent address registration in the settlement.

Geography
Liulin is located in a mountain area in the foot of the southwestern hills of Liulin mountain. The village has a continental climate, which makes it possible to grow a variety of crops. The village is suitable for animal husbandry.

The highest peak in Liulin mountain Dupevitsa (1256 m.) is close to the village. Liulin mountain connects with Vitosha mountain through a plain.

Culture and infrastructure
Liulin village has a good infrastructure with many public transportation lines passing through, mainly toward Knyazhevo, Vladaya, Bankya, and Pernik.

Buildings and infrastructure

 Horse base, stables, and riding facilities, horse riding club “Kibela”
 A new church was built in 2010, as a donation from Bozhidar Dimitrov
 Hristo Botev community hall and library

Ethnicity
According to the Bulgarian population census in 2011.

References

Villages in Pernik Province